Africa Paradis is a 2006 satirical speculative fiction film written and directed by Beninese actor Sylvestre Amoussou. It was produced in France and Benin and was intended to comment on the situation of African refugees in Europe.

Plot

In the year 2033, the United States of Africa is a thriving and affluent country located in Africa. At the same time, Europe struggles with economic and political crisis, poverty and underdevelopment. Olivier is a computer scientist who lives in France with Pauline, a teacher. Both are unemployed with few prospects given Europe's dire economy. The desperate couple decide to immigrate to Africa in hope of finding a better life, even knowing they will face anti-European discrimination in Africa.

On arrival in Africa, Olivier and Pauline's entrance visa is rejected. The couple then try to illegally cross the border hidden in a smuggler vehicle, but are stopped by border police and detained until they can be deported back to France. Olivier manages to escape, and is taken in by a group of poor white Africans who live in housing projects. He eventually steals the identity of a dead white man so he will have employment documentation.

Meanwhile, Pauline gets a job as a domestic servant to Modibo Koudossou, a politician who is sponsoring a controversial immigration reform bill to address the flood of economic refugees from Europe. Against a backdrop of political intrigue that includes an assassination attempt by corrupt political opponents, Pauline and Modibo grow increasingly attracted to one another. Eventually Olivier is caught and faces deportation to Europe, forcing Pauline to make a choice between the two men and the course of her own life.

Cast
Stéphane Roux as Olivier Morel 
Eriq Ebouaney as M'Doula 
Sylvestre Amoussou as Modibo Koudossou 
Charlotte Vermeil as Pauline 
Sandrine Bulteau as Clémence 
Martial Odone as M'Douala 
Mylène Wagram as Koudossou 
Emil Abossolo-Mbo as Yokossi 
Christian Gibert as Woytek 
Thierno Ndiaye Doss as Le ministre (as Thierno Ndiaye) 
Cheik Doukouré as Kobaou 
Jean-Pierre Beau as Sylvain 
Nathalie Chaban as Charlotte 
N'Gwamoué Diabaté as Papy 
Sonia Kagna as Mamy

Reception

In The Moving Arts Film Journal, reviewer Alison Frank considered Africa Paradis to be  "enjoyable as a comedy" while also thought-provoking, but also noted the film "felt a little amateurish" making it difficult to become fully involved in the story.

References

External links
 

2006 films
2006 science fiction films
French science fiction films
Beninese drama films
2000s French-language films
French satirical films
Films about immigration
Films about racism
Films set in Africa
Films set in the future
Films shot in Benin
Social science fiction films
2006 directorial debut films
2000s French films